Miriam Kolodziejová and Jesika Malečková were the defending champions but both players chose to participate with different partners. Kolodziejová partnered with Anastasia Dețiuc, but lost in the first round to Sada Nahimana and Alexandra Osborne. Malečková partnered alongside Vera Lapko, but lost in the semifinals to Elixane Lechemia and Julia Lohoff.

Lechemia and Lohoff went on to win the title, defeating Linda Klimovičová and Dominika Šalková in the final, 7–5, 7–5.

Seeds

Draw

Draw

References

External Links
Main Draw

Kuchyně Gorenje Prague Open - Doubles